Anna Callender Brackett (May 21, 1836 – March 18, 1911) was an American philosopher known for being a translator, feminist, and an educator. Her philosophical achievements are oftentimes overlooked. She translated Karl Rosenkranz's Pedagogics as a System and wrote The Education of American Girls, a response to arguments against the coeducation of males and females.

Life
Born to Samuel and Caroline Brackett, she was the oldest of five children. Her father was a dry goods merchant on Milk Street in Boston, Massachusetts, and the family lived in Somerville. Brackett attended private and public schools in Boston and Somerville and Abbot Academy. In 1856 she graduated from the state teaching school in Framingham, Massachusetts, now known at Framingham State University. She served as a teacher in East Brookfield, Massachusetts, and then as an assistant principal in the teaching school in Framingham. In 1861, Anna became vice principal in Charleston, South Carolina. At the start of the Civil War, she was forced to leave for New Orleans and then St. Louis where she met with the St. Louis Hegelians and later published the first English translation of several philosophical works. After briefly returning to Cambridge, Massachusetts, and teaching at the high school there, she then went back to St. Louis.

One of her biggest accomplishments came in 1863 when she was appointed principal of the St. Louis Normal School (Harris-Stowe State College), the first female principal of secondary school in the United States. During her tenure, Brackett worked to ensure female students had access to higher education and liberal studies as preparation for professional teaching. She made two proposals to the Board of Education that were eventually adopted. The first proposal was an age requirement for entrance to the school. Second, there should be an entrance exam for admission to the St. Louis Normal School. In 1872 Anna Brackett resigned as principal after there were changes in the curriculum that went against her beliefs. She moved to New York City with her domestic partner, Ida M. Eliot, the daughter of Congressman Thomas D. Eliot. The pair adopted their first daughter, Hope, in 1873 and their second daughter, Bertha, in 1875. In New York, Brackett started The Brackett School for Girls, located at 9 West 39th Street, and she hired notable female teachers such as Mary Mitchell Birchall, the first woman to receive a bachelor's degree from a New England college. Among Brackett's pupils was Ruth Sawyer, in whose Newbery Award-winning semi-autobiographical children's novel, Roller Skates, Brackett is remembered fondly as an imposing but beloved educator. Anna Brackett retired from teaching in 1894 and died in 1911. Brackett's brother, George, a Harvard graduate, and her two sisters ran a school in Brooklyn, New York. A biography of Brackett was published upon her death, entitled: Anna C. Brackett, in Memoriam, MDCCCXXXVI-MDCCCCXI: An Appreciation (1915).

Works
In 1874, Brackett published The Education of American Girls, an essay that applied Rosenkranz's theory of education to girls. In this essay, Brackett observes that a young woman must be guided through two steps of the learning process, the "perceptive stage" and "conceptual stage." In her opinion, no girl can excel in life without attaining both of these steps. Her thoughts were that an education which merely stops at the conceptual stage is not adequate. If undereducated and untrained in abstract thinking, women are at risk to becoming arbitrary if they were to become active in public affairs. Brackett made the point that if women are confined only to the family circle and taking care of the home, they will not be able to fully develop morally and intellectually. This would cause girls to lose their chance at asserting their independence or compete with others and gain the confidence needed to be successful in the public realm. Men, however, automatically enter into the public realm where they become independent persons, separate from the family. Brackett makes the argument that without being able to grow outside their homes, women face two dangers. The first danger is they grow to be ineffective in the public realm and perpetuate the stereotype of the "incompetent woman." The second danger is to a woman's well-being, risking becoming vulnerable to exploitation by men. This essay was the foundation to Brackett's belief that coeducation is important and necessary in the American education system.

Brackett wrote extensively regarding education and philosophy and published writings in Harper's Magazine and other well known publications.  She also published The Education of American Girls and served as an editor of New England Journal of Education.

References

Bibliography

External links 

 
 
 
 Jane Aitken Papers, American Philosophical Society.
 The First American Bible

1836 births
1911 deaths
19th-century American philosophers
20th-century American philosophers
Abbot Academy alumni
American women philosophers
Philosophers of education
People from Somerville, Massachusetts
20th-century American women
19th-century American women